A number of ships of the French Navy have borne the name Neptune, or a variant thereof:

  (1610–1615), a privateer 
  (1628–1641), a 16-gun ship of the line 
  (1651–1655), a ship of the line 
  (1666–1671), a 64-gun ship of the line, also known as Illustre 
  (1671–1679), a 36-gun ship of the line, also known as Beaufort 
  (1670–1702), a 40-gun ship of the line 
 , a 46-gun ship of the line 
  (1697–1699), a 24-gun frigate 
  (1705–1713), a 64-gun ship of the line 
  (1716), a 74-gun ship of the line 
  (1724–1747), a 74-gun ship of the line 
  (1778–1795), a 74-gun ship of the line 
 , a corvette 
  (1780–1782), a 6-gun schooner 
 , a 16-gun corvette 
 , a cutter
  (1795–1798), a gunboat
  (1795), a lugger
  (1799–1799), a schooner
  (1801–1805), troopship n°188
  (1804–1808), troopship n°262
 , a  launched in 1804, captured by the Spanish in 1808 and renamed 
  (1805–1814), a xebec
 , a brig launched in Venice in 1807, that the Royal Navy captured in 1808 and that became HMS Cretan
 Neptune (1811–1814), an unbuilt 110-gun 
  (1839–1858), an 80-gun ship of the line
  (1892–1908), a 
  (1914–1919), an auxiliary minesweeper
 , an ex-German ship of the Reichsbahn

French Navy ship names